The Basin Main Post Office in Basin, Wyoming was built in 1919 as part of a facilities improvement program by the United States Post Office Department. The post office in Basin was nominated to the National Register of Historic Places as part of a thematic study comprising twelve Wyoming post offices built to standardized USPO plans in the early twentieth century.

See also 
 Basin Republican-Rustler Printing Building
 National Register of Historic Places listings in Big Horn County, Wyoming

References

External links
 at the National Park Service's NRHP database
Basin Main Post Office at the Wyoming State Historic Preservation Office

Post office buildings on the National Register of Historic Places in Wyoming
Government buildings completed in 1919
Buildings and structures in Big Horn County, Wyoming
National Register of Historic Places in Big Horn County, Wyoming
1919 establishments in Wyoming
Neoclassical architecture in Wyoming